Guy or GUY may refer to:

Personal names 
 Guy (given name)
 Guy (surname)
 That Guy (...), the New Zealand street performer Leigh Hart

Places 
 Guy, Alberta, a Canadian hamlet
 Guy, Arkansas, US, a city
 Guy, Indiana, US, an unincorporated community
 Guy, Kentucky, US, an unincorporated community
 Guy, Texas, US, an unincorporated community
 Guy Street, Montreal, Canada

Art and entertainment

Films
 Guy (1997 film) (American, starring Vincent D'Onofrio)
 Guy (2018 film) (French, starring Alex Lutz)

Music 
 Guy (album), debut studio album of Guy (band) 1988
 Guy (band), an American R&B group
 "G.U.Y.", a 2014 song by Lady Gaga from the album Artpop

Transport 

 Guy (sailing), rope to control a spinnaker on a sailboat
 Air Guyane Express, ICAO code GUY
 Guy Motors, a former British bus and truck builder
 Guy (ship, 1933), see Boats of the Mackenzie River watershed
 Guy (ship, 1961), see Boats of the Mackenzie River watershed

Other uses
 Guy (grape), the variety Gouais blanc
 The Guy, an effigy burned on Guy Fawkes Night
 The Guy, the mascot of the band Disturbed
 A man
 Guyana, country code GUY
 Guy-wire (or guy-rope), a tensioned cable (or rope) designed to add stability to a free-standing structure.
 Saint Guy (disambiguation)

See also 
 
 
 Gal (disambiguation)
 Gi (disambiguation)
 Giy (disambiguation)
 Gui (disambiguation)
 Guys (disambiguation)
 Gy (disambiguation)